Ponnunjal is an Indian Tamil-language soap opera that aired on Sun TV from September 2, 2013 to October 22, 2016 for 939 episodes. It starred Shamitha, Vishwa, Manjula Parithala, Vanitha Hariharan, Shyam, Adhavan and Krithika Laddu.

The series reunited Rajkanth and Vanaja who had starred together on Metti Oli (2002–05) and Deepangal (2008–09). It was produced by Vision Time India Pvt Ltd's Vaidehi Ramamurthy.

It was the spin off of the serial Thiyagam which aired from 30 January 2012 to 31 August 2013 for 550 episodes.

Synopsis
Ponnunjal is the story of two sisters, Nandhini (Abitha/Shamitha Shreekumar) and Priya (Manjula Parithala), who both face new lives after marriage. Nandhini married Vishwa and Priya married Varun Adhavan. Both Nandhini face multiple marital challenges. The serial revolves around how they solve those issues and live their lives.

Cast

Main cast

 Abitha / Shamitha Shreekumar as Nandhini Vishwa
 Vishwa as Vishwa 
 Vanaja as Malathi Sundar 
 Rajkanth as Sundar 
 Asha Nair / Vandhana / Krithika Laddu as Akilandeshwari (Akila)(Main Antagonist)
 Vanitha Hariharan as Keerthana Arun 
 Manjula Parithala as Priya Varun 
 Shyam as Arun 
 Adhavan as Varun 
 Gayathri Yuvaraj / Hema Rajkumar as Ramyapriya 
 Shyam Ganesh as Shridhar 
 Manjari ad Rathidevi

Recurring cast

 Shamily Sukumar as Revathi Mahesh (1-814)
 Guhan Shanmugam as Mahesh (110-760)
 Vicky Krish as Karthik (896-939) (Dead)(Antagonist)
Naresh Eswar as Umesh
 K. S. Jayalakshmi as Krishnaveni,  Sundar's Mother (1-514)
 Rajasekhar as Ranganathan, Nandhini's Father (1-894)
 Abhilash as Prasanth
Aravesh as Arjun
 Sumangali as Amsavalli Ranganathan Nandhini's Mother (1-940)
Shyam Ganesh as Shridhar
Vandhana as Akilandeswarai
 Jayarekha as Maragatham, Vishwa's Mother (10-840)
Super Good Kannan as Aarumugam (Rathi's Husband)
B.R. Elavarasan as Maharaja (Mahesh and Vijay’s Father)
 Sujatha Panju as Vijayalakshmi Navaneethkrishnan, Arun's mother (754-816) (Dead)
C. Ranganathan as Navaneethkrishnan, Arun's father (755-900)
 Geetha Saraswathi as Varun's Mother (690-940)
 Harsha Nair as Revathi (110-728) (Replaced by Shamily)
 Suhasini as Nandhini's Work Assistant (199-730)
 Balambika as Maheswari(814-864)
 Bhaskar as WhatsApp Vadivel Akhila's Assistant (680-802)
 Krithika Laddu as Akhila (645-825)
 Nivisha as Uma
 Gayathri Yuvaraj/Hema Rajkumar as Ramya Priya (791-924)
 Geetha Sathish as (Satish Mom)
 Yuvashree as Nirmala Devi (791-894)
 Kalyanji as Kalyan
 Satish Kumar as Satish, Police Inspector, Varun's best friend (690-940)
 Ashwin as Shanmugam
 Bambai babu as Rajaraman (Vinoth's Father)
 Swetha as (Nandhini younger sister)  Revathi (1-120)
J.Lalitha as Adhi Lakshmi (Vinoth Mom)
 Vishwanath as Vinodhan
Sudha as Sudha
 Abitha as Nandhini Vishwa 
 Santhana Bharathi as Vishwa's Father (Dead)
 Senthilnathan as Meenakshi's Husband
 S.Sureshwar as Suresh
 Gowthami Vembunathan as Meenakshi 
 Sindhu Shyam as Shamilly
 Amarasigamani as Mahesh's Father
 Deepika as Saraswathy
 Jayanth as Thulasi's Father
 Baby Monna as Durga Devi
 Aravind as Aravind
 Shri Vidhya as Anjali 
 Shanthi Ganesh as Durga Devu
 Shrijith as Narayanan

Original soundtrack

Title song
The title song was composed by music director Hari, with lyrics written by Yugabharathi. It was sung by Priya Himesh.

Soundtrack

See also
 List of programs broadcast by Sun TV

References

External links
 Official Website 

Sun TV original programming
2013 Tamil-language television series debuts
Tamil-language television shows
2016 Tamil-language television series endings